This is a timeline of the development of radio in Wales.

1970s
 1970
 No events.

 1971
 No events.

 1972
12 July – Following the enabling of The Sound Broadcasting Act 1972, The Independent Broadcasting Authority is formed, paving the way for the launch of Independent Local Radio.

 1973
 No events.

 1974
30 September – Swansea Sound, the first Independent Local Radio station in Wales, begins broadcasting to the Swansea area.

 1975
 No events.

 1976
 No events.

 1977
 3 January – BBC Radio Cymru is launched.

 1978
 Autumn – Four experimental local radio stations broadcast for a single week: Radio Wrexham, Radio Deeside, Radio Merthyr and Radio Rhondda.
 23 November –
 All BBC national radio stations change their medium or long wave transmission wavelength as part of a plan for BBC AM broadcasting in order to improve national AM reception, and to conform with the Geneva Frequency Plan of 1975. Radio 1's transmission wavelength is moved from 247m (1214 kHz) to 275 & 285m (1053 & 1089 kHz) medium wave. Radio 2's wavelength is moved from 1500m (200 kHz) long wave to 433 & 330m (693 & 909 kHz) medium wave.  Radio 3 is moved from 464m (647 kHz) to 247m (1215 kHz) medium wave.  Radio 4 is moved from various medium wavelengths to 1500m (200 kHz) long wave.
 Due to Radio 4's transfer from medium wave to long wave, BBC Radio Scotland and BBC Radio Wales launch as full-time stations on Radio 4's former Welsh medium wave opt-out wavelengths of 340m (882 kHz) respectively, albeit initially with very limited broadcast hours due to very limited coverage of BBC Radio 4 on FM in both countries.

 1979
November – A weekday mind-morning programme launches on BBC Radio Cymru, thereby extending its broadcasting hours to 65 hours each week. Previously, apart from extended news bulletins at lunchtime and early evening, and some off-peak opt-outs, the station had only been on air at breakfast time.

1980s

 1980
 February – BBC Radio Deeside is launched as an opt-out service from BBC Radio Wales.
11 April – CBC in Cardiff becomes the first of the second tranche of Independent Local Radio stations to start broadcasting. It is the first new ILR station since 1976.

 1981
 October – BBC Radio Deeside is expanded to cover all of north east Wales and is renamed BBC Radio Clwyd.

 1982
 No events.

 1983
 18 April – BBC Radio Gwent launches as an opt-out service from BBC Radio Wales.
13 June – Gwent Broadcasting becomes the first station in the UK to occupy the newly released 102.2 to 104.5Mhz part of the VHF/FM waveband.
6 October – Centre Radio stops broadcasting after running into financial difficulties. A take-over bid was rejected by the IBA and the station went off air at 5.30pm.

 1984
 No events.

1985
 13 February – Financial difficulties force South Wales station Gwent Broadcasting to close down after less than two years on air.
14 October – At 6am, CBC is relaunched as Red Dragon Radio and broadcasts a 24-hour schedule - CBC had previously closed down between 1am and 6am. The station also covers the Newport area, offering a replacement service to Gwent Broadcasting, and provides separate breakfast shows for Cardiff and Newport until the early 1990s. 

 1986
The Home Office sanctions six experiments of split programming on Independent Local Radio. Up to ten hours a week of split programming is allowed. Marcher Sound is one of the stations to take advantage of this so that it can provide some programming in Welsh.

 1987 
 No events.

 1988
29 September – BBC Radio 1 starts broadcasting on FM in South Wales. 

 1989
31 March – Marcher Gold begins broadcasting on MW to Wrexham and Chester and the area's FM station is renamed MFM.
19 December – BBC Radio 1 starts transmitting on FM in the Cardigan Bay area.

1990s
 1990
15 July – Touch AM begins broadcasting in South Wales.

 1991
 March –  BBC Radio Gwent stops broadcasting.

 1992
14 December – Radio Ceredigion begins broadcasting to Aberystwyth and the West Wales Coast.

 1993
1 July – Radio Maldwyn begins broadcasting on AM to the Montgomeryshire area of Wales.
27 August – Marcher Coast begins broadcasting. The station covers the north Wales coastal area from Llandudno eastwards.
 October – BBC Radio Clwyd closes, although news opt-outs continue until 2002.

 1994
4 September – Galaxy 101 launches a dance music service to the Severn estuary area.

 1995
 30 September – Swansea Sound's FM frequency becomes a CHR (contemporary hit radio) station called 96.4 Sound Wave. while Swansea Sound continues to broadcast its full service format on 1170 AM.

 1996
23 November – Valleys Radio begins broadcasting on MW to the South Wales valleys.

 1997
 No events.

 1998
11 December – Champion FM begins broadcasting to Caernarfon and Anglesey.

 1999
 The BBC begins creating an FM network for BBC Radio Wales. Previously, apart from in Gwent, the station had only been available on MW.
19 August – BBC Radio 1 broadcasts its first split programming when it introduces weekly national new music shows for Scotland, Wales and Northern Ireland. The Session in Wales is presented by Bethan Elfyn and Huw Stephens.

2000s
 2000
1 May – 106.3 Bridge FM begins broadcasting to the Bridgend area of South Wales.
3 October – South Wales regional station Real Radio Wales begins broadcasting.

 2001
 31 July – The regional multiplex covering south Wales, MXR Severn Estuary, begins transmissions.

 2002
24 May – Wales gets its first community radio station when GTFM begins broadcasting to Pontypridd and surrounding areas. The station is one of 15 trial stations participating in the under an Access Radio experiment and following full evaluation, GTFM was licensed as the first community radio station in Wales under OFCOM's changed rules in 2006 
14 July – 102.5 Radio Pembrokeshire begins broadcasting.
BBC Radio Wales' news bulletins in north east Wales end.
Galaxy 101 is rebranded as Vibe 101.

 2003
3 January – Severn Estuary regional station Galaxy 101 is renamed Vibe 101.

 2004
30 January – The Swansea SW Wales (DAB Multiplex) begins broadcasting..
13 June – 97.1 Radio Carmarthenshire begins broadcasting.
14 July – 97.5 Scarlet FM begins broadcasting to the Llanelli area.

2005
 No events.

2006
 6 September – Vibe 101 is rebranded as Kiss 101.

 2007
 8 October – Radio Cardiff begins broadcasting.
 29 November – Nati0n Radio Wales begins broadcasting.
 14 December – Sunshine Radio (FM) begins broadcasting to Herefordshire and Monmouthshire.

 2008 
16 June – Nation Radio Wales begins broadcasting on FM across South Wales. It replaces Xfm South Wales. It gets the berth following the sale of Xfm South Wales to Town and Country (now Nation Broadcasting) on 30 May 2008.

 2009
March – Following Global Radio's takeover of GCap Media, Champion 103 is rebranded as Heart Cymru as part of a rollout of the Heart network across 29 local radio stations owned by Global. By this point, local programming is now reduced to ten hours on weekdays and seven hours at weekends.
30 April – Valleys Radio closes after thirteen years on air.

2010s
 2010
2 July – Heart North Wales and West replaces Heart North Wales Coast, Heart Cheshire and North East Wales and Heart Wirral.
 December – All local programming on Kiss 101 is dropped. Consequently the station, which broadcasts across South wales, is now a relay of the national network.
25 December – Radio Hafren launches as a replacement for Radio Maldwyn.
 
 2011
 3 January – Red Dragon FM is relaunched as Capital South Wales as part of a merger of owners Global's Hit Music and Galaxy networks to form the Capital FM network.

2012
1 June – Swansea's 102.1 Bay Radio is relaunched as Nation 80s, becoming the first FM station in the UK to play nothing but 80s music.

2013
21 January – Radio Today reports the name change of Nation 80s to Nation Hits, a move allowing the station to air a broader range of music. It is the station's third rebranding since 2009.
 29 July – The regional multiplex covering south Wales, MXR Severn Estuary, closes.
 Nation Radio Wales increases its coverage area across Wales via DAB when it began broadcasting to north-east Wales and parts of Cheshire and Merseyside in March, via MuxCo's Wrexham, Chester and Liverpool multiplex. and in August, the station launches on DAB in Pembrokeshire and Carmarthenshire via the Muxco Mid and West Wales multiplex.

2014
6 May – 
Real Radio is rebranded as Heart.
Following the launch of Heart North Wales, Capital North West and Wales replaces the former Heart station Heart North Wales & West and Heart Cymru is relaunched as Capital Cymru.
12 July – Anglesey gets its first full time station when bilingual community radio station Môn FM begins broadcasting.

2015
11 February – Radio Hafren closes after 22 years on air.

2016 
 29 February – The UK's second national commercial multiplex starts broadcasting. However, only 73% of the UK's population is able to receive it.
 19 September – BBC Cymru launches a pop-up radio station,  (Radio Cymru More), broadcasting for three months in the run-up to BBC Radio Cymru's 40th anniversary. Consisting of five hours of music-led entertainment programming each weekday, Radio Cymru Mwy is available on DAB in south east Wales and online.

2017
 19 September – Nation Radio Wales begins broadcasting on FM in Carmarthenshire (102.9 FM) and Pembrokeshire (107.1 FM) 

2018
 29 January – BBC Radio Cymru 2 begins broadcasting at 6.30am on 29 January 2018. It airs as an opt-out service from 7-9am on Mondays – Saturdays and from 7-10 am on Sundays.
 15 May – Sound Digital announces that it will add 19 transmitters to its network, including in parts of Wales.
 24 October – BBC Radio Wales' FM coverage in North East and Mid Wales by taking over 32 transmitters previously used by BBC Radio 3. The changeover allowed an estimated 400,000 listeners to receive Radio Wales on FM, extending its reach to a potential 91% of households in Wales.

2019
31 May – Radio Ceredigion drops all of Capital's networked programming and introduces a full schedule of local output, including an additional Welsh-language daytime show. The station retains both the Capital branding and much of the network's Contemporary hit radio music playlist.
31 May – Radio Ceredigion ceases broadcasting after its owners, Nation Broadcasting, decided to close the station and replace it with a relay of Nation Radio Wales.

2020s
2020
 September – Swansea Sound joins the Greatest Hits Radio network and is rebranded as Greatest Hits Radio South Wales. Most of the station's local output - including Breakfast, daytime and Welsh language shows - was retained due to conditions placed on the station's AM broadcast licence by OFCOM.
16 October – Global switches off its mediumwave frequencies in Cardiff and Newport  The frequencies had most recently been used to relay Smooth Radio.

2021
May – Môn FM's broadcast area expands when two new transmitters are switched on. They cover Penmynydd, which covers eastern Anglesey and north Gwynedd, and Nebo, near Amlwch, serving north Anglesey. The station began broadcasting on 96.8 FM from the Penmynydd transmitter, targeting eastern Anglesey and north Gwynedd, on 6 May 2021.

2022
21 April – Nation Broadcasting launches Breezy Radio, replacing Swansea Bay Radio on 102.1FM in Swansea. The new station is available throughout Wales on DAB.
1 September – Easy Radio replaces Breezy Radio.

See also
Timeline of radio in London
Timeline of radio in Manchester
Timeline of radio in Northern Ireland
Timeline of radio in Scotland

References

Radio in Wales